Petegem may refer to:

Places
 Petegem-aan-de-Leie, a village in the Deinze municipality of Belgium
 Petegem-aan-de-Schelde, a village in the Wortegem-Petegem municipality of Belgium

People
 Peter Van Petegem, road racing cyclist